Martin Rázus (pseudonym: Mrazák; 18 October 1888 – 8 August 1937) was a Slovak poet, dramatist, writer, politician  and Lutheran priest

References

Sources
 Michal Gáfrik: Martin Rázus I., Národné literárne centrum 1998, .
 Michal Gáfrik: Martin Rázus II., Národné literárne centrum 2000, .

1888 births
1937 deaths
Writers from Liptovský Mikuláš
People from the Kingdom of Hungary
Slovak Lutherans
Slovak National Party (historical) politicians
Members of the Chamber of Deputies of Czechoslovakia (1929–1935)
Members of the Chamber of Deputies of Czechoslovakia (1935–1939)
Slovak poets
20th-century poets
20th-century Lutherans